McGees is an extinct town in Jefferson County, in the U.S. state of Washington.

The community was named after Samuel McGee, an early settler.

References

Ghost towns in Washington (state)
Geography of Jefferson County, Washington